The National Golf Club of Kansas City is an exclusive golf club located in the Kansas City, Missouri, suburb of Parkville. The golf course was designed by champion golfer Tom Watson, a native of Kansas City, Missouri. For two years (2003–04) the club hosted the Senior PGA's Bayer Advantage golf tournament. It features two golf courses, the north side or "The National", and the south side or "The Deuce". Both are owned and operated by the National Golf Club of Kansas City. 
Along with being a golf club, it is also a community with tennis courts, a pool, and multiple ponds. 

Route 45, which passes the course is called the Tom Watson Parkway.

External links
National Golf Club of Kansas City

Sports in the Kansas City metropolitan area
Buildings and structures in Platte County, Missouri
Golf clubs and courses in Missouri